Frédéric Ladislas Joseph Marty (23 June 1911 in Albi, Tarn – 14 June 1940, Gulf of Finland) was a French mathematician.

Frédéric Marty's father was the mathematician Joseph Marty (1885–1914), who taught at the lycée d'Albi and as a French army officer was killed in action in WW I.

Frédéric Marty received his doctorate in 1931 from the École normale supérieure (ENS). After that he was a maître de conférences at Aix-Marseille University. He was a French Air Force lieutenant in WW II and was a victim of the Aero Flight 1631 shootdown when he was a diplomatic courier on board a Finnish passenger airliner that was shot down by the Soviet Air Force.

Marty is known in the theory of normal families for Marty's theorem. This theorem from his dissertation states that for any family  of meromorphic functions,  is normal if and only if 's derived family of spherical derivatives is locally bounded. Marty also founded the theory of hypergroups and hyperstructures. He was an invited speaker at the International Congress of Mathematics (ICM) 1936 in Oslo.

References

1911 births
1940 deaths
20th-century French mathematicians
Complex analysts
French military personnel killed in World War II
École Normale Supérieure alumni
Academic staff of Aix-Marseille University
Victims of aviation accidents or incidents in Finland
Victims of aircraft shootdowns
French Air Force personnel of World War II